Timothy "Tim" Pusey (born 26 August 1992) is an Australian professional darts player who plays in the Professional Darts Corporation (PDC) events.

Career

A patient care assistant by trade, Pusey has mainly played on the Dartplayers Australia (DPA) Tour. His first big exposure was qualifying for all 3 2018 World Series of Darts events in Australia and New Zealand as the number 1 ranked player in the DPA rankings. He would lose in the first round of all three events to Gary Anderson in Auckland, Michael Smith in Melbourne and to Rob Cross in Brisbane.

He would eventually win his first DPA Tour event in Mitchelton a couple of months later with a 6–4 over Robbie King. He just missed out on qualification for the 2019 PDC World Darts Championship by losing the Oceanic Masters final 3 sets to 2 to James Bailey, despite having match darts to win.

Pusey also qualified for the 2019 Melbourne Darts Masters, but lost to Michael van Gerwen in the first round.

References

External links

1992 births
Living people
Australian darts players
Professional Darts Corporation associate players
Sportspeople from Perth, Western Australia